Ränneslöv is a locality situated in Laholm Municipality, Halland County, Sweden, with 413 inhabitants in 2010.

Famous persons from Ränneslöv 
Karl-Johan Johnsson

Sports 

Ränneslöv have one football team called Ränneslövs GIF

References 

Populated places in Laholm Municipality